Aglenus is a genus of narrow-waisted bark beetles in the family Salpingidae. There is at least one described species in Aglenus, A. brunneus.

References

Further reading

External links

 

Salpingidae
Articles created by Qbugbot